Calcutta School of Tropical Medicine (CSTM) is a medical institute from Kolkata, India dedicated in the field of tropical disease. It was established in 1914 by Leonard Rogers (1868–1962) of the Indian Medical Service, professor of pathology at the Calcutta Medical College. It was, till 2003, affiliated with the University of Calcutta. Now it is under the West Bengal University of Health Sciences.

Prominent researchers like U. N. Bramhachari, Ernest Muir, Ronald Ross, Rabindra Nath Chaudhuri, Ram Narayan Chakravarti and Jyoti Bhusan Chatterjee worked in this institute.

Notable alumni
 Ram Baran Yadav, first president of Nepal
 Baba Amte, Indian Social Worker and social activist who worked for the empowerment and rehabilitation of people suffering from leprosy

References

External links
Calcutta School of Tropical Medicine-India

Medical College and Hospital, Kolkata
Healthcare in Kolkata
Academic institutions associated with the Bengal Renaissance
Educational institutions established in 1914
Affiliates of West Bengal University of Health Sciences
Tropical medicine organizations
1914 establishments in British India